The 2013 New Orleans Privateers baseball team represented University of New Orleans in the 2013 NCAA Division I baseball season. Because of renovations to  Maestri Field, the Privateers played their home games at Wesley Barrow Stadium.

The team was led by fourth year head coach, Bruce Peddie who came off of a 17-27 record for the 2012 season. For the 2013 season, the Privateers competed as a Division I Independent after a 1-year stint as a Division II Independent.

Personnel

Roster

^Denotes players who also share pitching duties.
2013 UNO Privateers Roster

Coaching Staff

2013 UNO Privateers Coaching Staff

Schedule

! style="background:#003399;color:#C0C0C0;"| Regular Season
|- valign="top"

|- bgcolor="#ffbbbb"
| February 15 ||  || -  || Wesley Barrow Stadium || 4–7 || A. Winkelman (1-0)||G. Manning (0-1)|| B. Hurst || 410 || 0-1
|- bgcolor="#ffbbbb"
| February 16 || Southeast Missouri State || - || Wesley Barrow Stadium || 1-6 || Z. Smith (1-0)||A. Smith (0-1)|| None || 297 || 0-2
|- bgcolor="#ffbbbb"
| February 17 || Southeast Missouri State || - || Wesley Barrow Stadium || 2-11 ||W. Spitzfaden (1-0)||K. Blancaneaux (0-1)||None|| 272 || 0-3
|- bgcolor="#ffbbbb"
| February 19 || at #1 Arkansas || - || Baum Stadium || 0-14 || C. Poche (1-0)||D. Martinez (0-1)|| None || N/A || 0-4
|- bgcolor="#ffbbbb"
| February 19 || at #1 Arkansas || - || Baum Stadium || 0-3 ||L. Simpson (1-0)||B. Prest (0-1)||J. Beeks|| 1,943 || 0-5
|- bgcolor="#ffbbbb"
| February 22 || at  || - || Eddie Stanky Field || 6-29 || J. Traylor (1-0)||S. Speer (0-1)|| None || 1,246 || 0-6
|- bgcolor="#CCCCCC"
| February 23 || at South Alabama|| - || Eddie Stanky Field || colspan=6|Postponed
|- bgcolor="#ffbbbb"
| February 24 || at South Alabama || - || Eddie Stanky Field || 1-4 || J. Noble (2-0)||A. Smith (0-2)|| B. Boyle || N/A || 0-7
|- bgcolor="#ffbbbb"
| February 24 || at South Alabama || - || Eddie Stanky Field || 2-5 || D. Stamey (1-0)||B. Prest (0-2)|| K. Bartsch || 1,691 || 0-8
|- bgcolor="#ffbbbb"
| February 27 || at  || - || Turchin Stadium || 3-5 || B. Wilson (1-0)||S. Speer (0-2)|| A. Garner || N/A || 0-9
|-

|- bgcolor="#ffbbbb"
| March 1 || at  || - || Bear Stadium  || 1-11 ||C. McClanahan (2-0)||B. Prest (0-3)|| None || 114 || 0–10
|- bgcolor="#ffbbbb"
| March 2 || || - || Bear Stadium || 1-5 || T. Mateychick (1-1)||A. Smith (0-3)|| None || 97 || 0–11
|- bgcolor="#ffbbbb"
| March 3 || at Central Arkansas || - || Bear Stadium || 3-4 ||E. McKinzie (2-0) || A. Shirley (0-1) || None || 109 || 0–12
|- bgcolor="#ffbbbb"
| March 8 || at  || - || Cowboy Diamond || 2-5 || B. Kingsley (2-2) || A. Smith (0-4)|| T. McGee || 212 || 0-13
|- bgcolor="#ffbbbb"
| March 9 || at McNeese || - || Cowboy Diamond || 8-10 || B. Ware (3-1)||S. Speer (0-3) || S. Peterson (4) || N/A || 0-14
|- bgcolor="#ccffcc"
| March 9 || at McNeese || - || Cowboy Diamond || 8-7 || R. Winter (1-0) || M. Desabrais (0-1) || None || 351 || 1-14
|- bgcolor="#ccffcc"
| March 12 ||   || - || Wesley Barrow Stadium || 6-5 ||S. Speer (1-3)||G. Harrison (1-1)|| None || 378 || 2-14
|- bgcolor="#ccffcc"
| March 13 || Alcorn State || - || Wesley Barrow Stadium || 7-5 || R. Winter (2-0) || J. Lemond (0-2) || None || 341 || 3-14
|- bgcolor="#ffbbbb"
| March 15 ||  || - || Cougar Field || 0-10 || D. Newman (3-0) || S. Speer (1-4) || None || 304 || 3-15
|- bgcolor="#ffbbbb"
| March 15 || at  || - || Cougar Field || 3-13 || D. Poncedeleon (2-2) || B. Prest (0-4) || None || 1,011 || 3-16
|- bgcolor="#ffbbbb"
| March 16 || Baylor || - || Cougar Field || 3-8 || B. McCormack (1-0) || D. Martinez (0-2) || None || 579 || 3-17
|- bgcolor="#ffbbbb"
| March 17 || at Houston || - || Cougar Field || 3–8 || T. Ford (2-0) || A. Smith (0-5) || None || 1,064 || 3-18
|- bgcolor="#ccffcc"
| March 19 || at Tulane || - || Turchin Stadium || 5-4 || B. Prest (1-4) || E. Gibbs (0-1) || S. Speer (1) || 1,897 || 4-18
|- bgcolor="#ffbbbb"
| March 23 || at  || - || Wilbert Ellis Field || 4-5 || TJ Murphy (2-1) || R. Winter (2-1) || Z. Moreau || 52 || 4-19
|- bgcolor="#ffbbbb"
| March 24 || at Grambling || - || Wilbert Ellis Field || 5-9 || A. Manrrique || S. Speer (1-5) || Z. Moreau|| 122 || 4-20
|- bgcolor="#ffbbbb"
| March 24 || at Grambling || - || Wilbert Ellis Field || 5-17 || R. Bautista || B. Prest (1-5) || None || 121 || 4-21
|- bgcolor="#ffbbbb"
| March 26 || at   || - || Ray E. Didier Field || 4–14 || Z. Thiac (2-1) || S. Potter (0-1) || None || 420 || 4–22
|- bgcolor="#ffbbbb"
| March 28 || at  || - || Hawley Field || 2–11 || B. Dykxhoorn (1-0) || S. Laigast (0-1) || None || 191 || 4-23
|- bgcolor="#ffbbbb"
| March 29 || at West Virginia || - || Hawley Field || 2-12 || H. Musgrave (4-1) || A. Smith (0-6) || None || 326 || 4-24
|- bgcolor="#ffbbbb"
| March 30 || at West Virginia || - || Hawley Field || 1-5 || C. Walter (2-2) || S. Speer (1-6) || None || N/A || 4-25
|- bgcolor="#ffbbbb"
| March 30 || at West Virginia || - || Hawley Field || 3-4 || R. Hostranger (2-0) || G. Manning (0-2) || P. Paul || 503 || 4-26
|-

|- align="center" bgcolor="#cffcc"
| April 1 ||  || - || Wesley Barrow Stadium || 1-0 || A. Smith (1-6) || A. Knowles (1-2) || S. Speer (2) || 296|| 5-26
|- align="center" bgcolor="#ffbbb"
|April 9 ||  || - || Wesley Barrow Stadium || 1-2 || N. Johnson (1-0) || R. Winter (2-2) || None || 418 || 5-27
|- align="center" bgcolor="#ffbbb"
|April 10 || at Southern Miss || - || Pete Taylor Park || 5-8 || J. Winston (1-1) || A. Shirley (0-2) || J. McMahon (1) || 2,907 || 5-28
|- align="center" bgcolor="#ffbbb"
|April 12 || Georgia State || - || Wesley Barrow Stadium || 3-5 || B. Burns (5-2) || S. Potter (0-2) || M. Rose (3) || 461 || 5-29
|- align="center" bgcolor="#ffbbb"
|April 13 || Georgia State || - || Wesley Barrow Stadium || 4-5 || J. Stuckey (3-1) || A. Shirley (0-3) || None || N/A || 5-30
|- align="center" bgcolor="#ffbbb"
|April 13 || Georgia State || - || Wesley Barrow Stadium || 5-6 (11) || C. Stanley (3-1) || R. Winter (2-3) || None || 418 || 5-31
|- bgcolor="#ccffcc"
| April 14 || Georgia State || - || Wesley Barrow Stadium || 3-2 || A. Smith (2-6) || N. Squeglia (3-1) || None || 385 || 6-31
|-align="center" bgcolor="#ffbbb"
|April 16 || at    || - || Alumni Field || 2-7 || J. Hymel (5-3) || S. Laigast (0-2) || None || 889 || 6-23
|- align="center" bgcolor="#ffbbb"
| April 17 || at Tulane || - || Turchin Stadium || 2-3 || A. Reeves (1-0) || S. Potter (0-3) || I. Gibaut (8) || 2,160 || 6-33
|- align="center" bgcolor="#ffbbb"
| April 19 || at  || - || L. Dale Mitchell Park || 0-10|| J. Gray (7-1)|| B. Prest (1-6) || None || N/A || 6-34
|- align="center" bgcolor="#ffbbb"
| April 20 || at Oklahoma || - || L. Dale Mitchell Park || 5-14 || D. Overton (8-2) || A. Smith (2-7) || None || N/A || 6-35
|- align="center" bgcolor="#ffbbb"
| April 21 || at Oklahoma || - || L. Dale Mitchell Park|| 3-14 || E. Carnes (2-1) || S. Speer (1-7) || None || 1,039 || 6-36
|- align="center" bgcolor="#ffbbb"
| April 23 || Nicholls State || - || Wesley Barrow Stadium || 5-16 || T. Byrd (5-3) || S. Potter (0-4) || None || 341 || 6-37
|- align="center" bgcolor="#ffbbb"
| April 24 || at Jackson State || - || Braddy Field || 6-9 || A. Rodriguez (4-0) || G. Manning (0-3) || None || 35 || 6-38
|- bgcolor="#ccffcc"
| April 26 || LSU-Alexandria || - || Wesley Barrow Stadium || 2-1 ||A. Smith (3-7) || T. Olinde (1-3) || R. Winter (1) || 387 || 7-38
|- align="center" bgcolor="#ffbbb"
| April 27 || LSU-Alexandria|| - || Wesley Barrow Stadium || 4-5 || P. Ingraffia (3-0) || G. Manning (0-4) || H. Wallace (4) || 418 || 7-39
|-

|- align="center" bgcolor="#ffbbb"
| May 1 || at Tulane || - || Turchin Stadium || 1-3 || R. LeBlanc (3-3) || A. Smith (3-8) || I. Gibaut || 1,941 || 7-40
|- bgcolor="#CCCCCC"
| May 2 || Mississippi Valley State || - || Summit, MS || colspan=6|Cancelled
|- bgcolor="#CCCCCC"
| May 2 || Mississippi Valley State || - || Summit, MS || colspan=6|Cancelled
|- align="center" bgcolor="#ffbbb"
| May 14 || at #2 LSU || - || Alex Box Stadium || 2-11 || H. Newman (2-0) || A. Smith (3-9) || None || 5,534 || 7-41
|- align="center" bgcolor="#ffbbb"
| May 16 || at #28 Campbell || - || Jim Perry Stadium || 0-14 || R. Mattes (7-3) || B. Prest (1-7) || None || 216 || 7-42
|- align="center" bgcolor="#ffbbb"
| May 17 || at #28 Campbell || - || Jim Perry Stadium || 0-6 (11)|| H. Bowers (9-0) || D. Martinez (0-3) || None || 306 || 7-43
|- align="center" bgcolor="#ffbbb"
| May 18 || at #28 Campbell || - || Jim Perry Stadium || 6-9 || R. Thompson (8-0) || S. Speer (1-8) || None || 354 || 7-44
|-

New Orleans Privateers in the 2013 Major League Baseball Draft
The following members of the New Orleans Privateers baseball program were drafted in the 2013 MLB Draft.

References

New Orleans Privateers
New Orleans Privateers baseball seasons
New